Alopoglossus gorgonae is a species of lizard in the family Alopoglossidae. It is  found in Colombia and Ecuador.

References

Alopoglossus
Reptiles described in 1994
Taxa named by Dennis M. Harris
Taxobox binomials not recognized by IUCN